Naveen Kumar Goyat is an Indian professional kabaddi player who plays for the Indian national kabaddi team and Dabang Delhi KC in the Pro Kabaddi League. His speedy raiding and consistency makes him one of the best raiders in the league.

Early life 
Naveen was born in Sultanpur, Haryana, on 14 February 2000. His father was a driver; and he was introduced to the sport by his grandfather. He completed his education at Kurukshetra University. He is the first person born in the twenty first century to play in the Pro Kabaddi League, and was also the youngest to do so.

Pro Kabaddi League career

Season 6 
Naveen made his debut in 2018, Season 6 of the Pro Kabaddi League for the club Dabang Delhi. He finished the season as the team's top scorer with 177 points and helped it to the playoffs.

Season 7 
He performed consistently in Season 7 and won the Most valuable player Award (MVP). The team emerged runner-up. His performance placed him as one of the league's best raiders, scoring 300 points in a single season. He scored Super 10s  (more than 10 points in a single game) in 22 of the 23 matches he played. He also got the nickname 'Naveen Express' for his speedy raids and consistency.

Season 8 
Naveen played in the first few matches of the tournament and the team won initial games. He also became the fastest player to reach 600 points in the history of the league. However, he had to walk out in the middle due to an injury.He returned in the latter stage of the tournament. Dabang Delhi won the tournament. Naveen won the Most Valuable Player Award as well.

International career 
Naveen Kumar plays for the Indian national kabaddi team. He was a part of the national team at the 13th South-Asian Games, where he played an important role in helping the team win the tournament. He scored a Super 10 in the final against Sri Lanka.

References 

Kabaddi players from Haryana
Living people
2000 births